The 2009 Credicard Citi MasterCard Tennis Cup was a professional tennis tournament played on outdoor red clay courts. It was the ninth edition of the tournament which was part of the 2009 ATP Challenger Tour. It took place in Campos do Jordão, Brazil between 3 and 9 August 2009.

Singles entrants

Seeds

 Rankings are as of July 27, 2009.

Other entrants
The following players received wildcards into the singles main draw:
  José Pereira
  Rafael Rondino
  Ricardo Siggia

The following players received a Special Exempt into the main draw:
  Guillermo Alcaide

The following players received entry from the qualifying draw:
  Alexandre Bonatto
  Raven Klaasen
  André Miele
  Guido Pella

Champions

Singles

 Horacio Zeballos def.  Thiago Alves, 6–7(4), 6–4, 6–3

Doubles

 Joshua Goodall /  Samuel Groth def.  Rogério Dutra da Silva /  Júlio Silva, 7–6(4), 6–3

External links
Official website
ITF search 
2010 Draws

Credicard Citi MasterCard Tennis Cup
Credicard Citi MasterCard Tennis Cup
MasterCard Tennis Cup
Credicard Citi MasterCard Tennis Cup